Die Sister, Die! (also known as The Companion) is a 1978 American thriller film directed by Randall Hood.

Plot summary
Edward (Jack Ging) is tired of the "allowance" granted him by his sister Amanda (Edith Atwater) and becomes impatient for her death and his inheritance. To hasten her demise, or at least stop her suicides from being thwarted, Edward hires Esther (Antoinette Bower), a discredited ex-nurse, to watch over her. Esther is less than enthusiastic about killing the old woman, and curious about the secrets held in the house, including a mysterious third sister, Nell.

Cast
Jack Ging as Edward
Edith Atwater as Amanda
Antoinette Bower as Esther
Kent Smith as Dr. Thorne
Robert Emhardt as Father
Rita Conde as Mrs. Gonzalez

Soundtrack
The film's score was composed by Hugo Friedhofer, and performed by the National Philharmonic Orchestra conducted by Carl Brandt. It was Friedhofer's final movie work. In 2014 Intrada Records released a limited edition album of the complete score.

Remake
The film was remade in 2013 by director, writer and producer Dustin Ferguson, starring Brinke Stevens as Amanda Price.

See also
 List of American films of 1978

References

External links

 

1978 films
American thriller films
1970s thriller films
Films scored by Hugo Friedhofer
1970s English-language films
1970s American films